Glasgow is an unincorporated community in Thomas County, in the U.S. state of Georgia.

History
A post office called Glasgow was established in 1853, and remained in operation until 1905. The community was named after Glasgow, in Scotland, the ancestral home of a large share of the first settlers.

References

Unincorporated communities in Thomas County, Georgia